The 1993 Cincinnati Bearcats football team represented the University of Cincinnati as an independent during the 1993 NCAA Division I-A football season. Led by Tim Murphy in his fifth and final year as head coach, Cincinnati compiled a record of 8–3. The Bearcats played their home games at Nippert Stadium in Cincinnati.

Schedule

References

Cincinnati
Cincinnati Bearcats football seasons
Cincinnati Bearcats football